The Coram Hotel, located on California Ave. in Libby in Lincoln County, Montana, was listed on the National Register of Historic Places in 2012.

It was built as The Coram in 1899 but was left unfinished for 12 years, after the mining industry collapsed.  Per a 2012 news article, it was later used to shield cattle during bad weather "and as a town meeting hall when they could shoo the cows out."  It was opened as a hotel in 1910 as Hotel Libby.

References

Hotel buildings on the National Register of Historic Places in Montana
Hotel buildings completed in 1910
Hotels in Montana
National Register of Historic Places in Lincoln County, Montana
1910 establishments in Montana